In mathematics, orthogonal functions belong to a function space that is a vector space equipped with a bilinear form. When the function space has an interval as the domain, the bilinear form may be the integral of the product of functions over the interval:

As with a basis of vectors in a finite-dimensional space, orthogonal functions can form an infinite basis for a function space. Conceptually, the above integral is the equivalent of a vector dot product; two vectors are mutually independent (orthogonal) if their dot-product is zero.

Suppose  is a sequence of orthogonal functions of nonzero L2-norms .  It follows that the sequence  is of functions of L2-norm one, forming an orthonormal sequence.  To have a defined L2-norm, the integral must be bounded, which restricts the functions to being square-integrable.

Trigonometric functions

Several sets of orthogonal functions have become standard bases for approximating functions. For then 

and the integral of the product of the two sine functions vanishes. Together with cosine functions, these orthogonal functions may be assembled into a trigonometric polynomial to approximate a given function on the interval with its Fourier series.

Polynomials

If one begins with the monomial sequence  on the interval  and applies the Gram–Schmidt process, then one obtains the Legendre polynomials. Another collection of orthogonal polynomials are the associated Legendre polynomials.

The study of orthogonal polynomials involves weight functions  that are inserted in the bilinear form:

Zernike polynomials are defined on the unit disk and have orthogonality of both radial and angular parts.

Binary-valued functions
Walsh functions and Haar wavelets are examples of orthogonal functions with discrete ranges.

Rational functions

In this case it is convenient to apply the Cayley transform first, to bring the argument into . This procedure results in families of rational orthogonal functions called Legendre rational functions and Chebyshev rational functions.

In differential equations
Solutions of linear differential equations with boundary conditions can often be written as a weighted sum of orthogonal solution functions (a.k.a. eigenfunctions), leading to generalized Fourier series.

See also
 Eigenvalues and eigenvectors
 Hilbert space
 Karhunen–Loève theorem
 Lauricella's theorem
 Wannier function

References

 George B. Arfken & Hans J. Weber (2005) Mathematical Methods for Physicists, 6th edition, chapter 10: Sturm-Liouville Theory — Orthogonal Functions, Academic Press.
 
 Giovanni Sansone  (translated by Ainsley H. Diamond) (1959) Orthogonal Functions, Interscience Publishers.

External links 
 Orthogonal Functions, on MathWorld.

Functional analysis
Types of functions